The 1973 Safari Rally (formally the 21st East Africa Safari Rally) was the fourth round of the inaugural World Rally Championship season. Run in mid-April in central Kenya, the Safari was a markedly different rally from the other dates on the WRC schedule. About  of gravel roads comprised the course, though there were not distinct special stages as in other rallies, but instead the course was uncontrolled. The rally was considered very punishing, and thus many of the successful teams were specifically focused on it, leading to a different set of front-runners than led most other rallies. The rally was won by a local driver, Shekhar Mehta.

Report 
In 1973, and for several years afterward, only manufacturers were given points for finishes in WRC events. Like the drivers, the cars were different for Africa than for other rallies. As a result, the successful types did not mirror the results of other rallies on the circuit, and Datsun and Peugeot both made strong showings. Additionally, cars were not broken into separate groups or classes as in other rallies, so only overall results were classified. Time was not measured as the total elapsed through special stages as with other rallies, but instead a penalty was assessed at each time control for not meeting the target: total penalty time was the measure of who was in what place.

Results 

Source: Independent WRC archive

Championship standings after the event

References

External links 
 Official website of the World Rally Championship
 1973 Safari Rally  at Rallye-info 

Safari
Safari Rally
Safari Rally, 1973